= Eugene Laughlin =

American politician

Eugene L. Laughlin
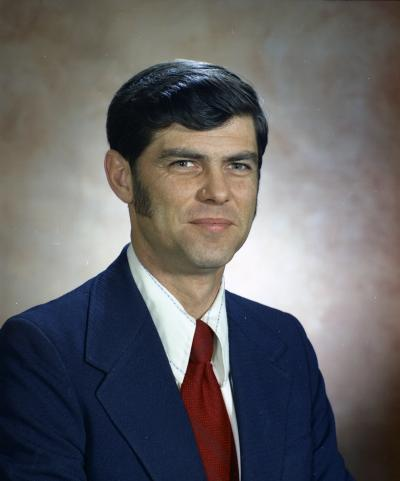
- Laughlin in 1973

Member of the Washington House of Representatives for the 17th district
- In office 1973–1977

Personal details
- Born: 1938 (age 87–88) Peoria, Illinois, United States
- Party: Democratic
- Education: Western Washington State College (BA Ed. & BA)
- Occupation: teacher

Eugene L. "Gene" Laughlin (born 1938) is an American former politician in the state of Washington. He was in the Washington House of Representatives from 1973 to 1977, from the 17th district, which included Klickitat County, Skamania County, and part of Clark County.
